The Coimbra Academic Association - volleyball (Portuguese: Associação Académica de Coimbra - Secção de Voleibol) is the volleyball sports section of the Coimbra Academic Association, from Coimbra, Portugal.

The AAC Voleibol team won the national championships in 1966/67, 1968/69 and 1970/71 seasons, and currently plays in the Portuguese Volleyball League A2.
 The AAC participates in the Supertaça (Supercup).

References

Coimbra Academic Association
Portuguese volleyball teams